is a railway station in the city of Toyota, Aichi Prefecture, Japan, operated by the third sector Aichi Loop Railway Company.

Lines

Station layout
The station has two elevated side platforms, with the station building located underneath. However, the platforms are not matched. Platform 1 can handle a full train of 10 carriages, but Platform 2 is short and can accommodate only four carriages in length. The station building has automated ticket machines, TOICA automated turnstiles and is staffed.

Platforms

Adjacent stations

Station history
At the time, the station had a single side platform. With the privatization of the JNR on April 1, 1987, the station came under control of the JR-Tokai. The station was transferred to the third sector Aichi Loop Railway Company on January 31, 1988.

Passenger statistics
In fiscal 2017, the station was used by an average of 1875 passengers daily.

Surrounding area
 Kamigō Community Center
 Toyota Technical High School

See also
 List of railway stations in Japan

References

External links

Official home page 

Railway stations in Japan opened in 1976
Railway stations in Aichi Prefecture
Toyota, Aichi